Phrynomantis is a genus of frog in the family Microhylidae. They are also known as rubber frogs, red-marked frogs, red-marked short-headed frogs, and snake-necked frogs. The genus is found in Subsaharan Africa.

Species 
The genus has five species.

References

 
Microhylidae
Amphibian genera
Amphibians of Africa
Taxa named by Wilhelm Peters
Taxonomy articles created by Polbot